United States v. Montgomery Country Board of Education, 395 U.S. 225 (1969), was a case heard before the United States Supreme Court concerning the integration of public schools in Montgomery County, Alabama.

See also
List of United States Supreme Court cases, volume 395

External links

1969 in United States case law
Civil rights movement case law
United States school desegregation case law
United States Supreme Court cases
United States Supreme Court cases of the Warren Court
United States equal protection case law